TPL may refer to:

Biology and chemistry
 Thromboplastin
 Time-Place learning

Companies and organizations
Tallinn French School
Terumo Penpol, a subsidiary of Terumo Corp., Japan
 Texas Pacific Land Trust
 The Trust for Public Land
 Toronto Public Library

Computers
 Table Producing Language, an IBM mainframe computer program, superseded by TPL Tables
 TPL Tables, commercial product that supersedes Table Producing Language
 Targeted peripheral list, part of USB On-The-Go
 Task Parallel Library, a component of the managed Parallel FX Library from Microsoft
 Temporal Process Language

Transportation and logistics
 Trasporti Pubblici Luganesi, the public (bus) transportation system in Lugano, Switzerland
 Third-party logistics
 Towed pinger locator, used in underwater search for missing aircraft

Other uses 
 Third party liability (disambiguation)
 Third-party logistics, use of third-party businesses to outsource elements of a company's distribution, warehousing, and fulfillment services